Joondalup Wolves is an NBL1 West club based in Perth, Western Australia. The club fields a team in both the Men's and Women's NBL1 West. The club is a division of Wanneroo Basketball Association (WBA), the major administrative basketball organisation in the Joondalup/Wanneroo region. The Wolves play their home games at HBF Arena.

Club history

Background
In 1982, Wanneroo District Basketball Association was established. In 1983, the association moved into Joondalup Basketball Stadium. Being one of the fastest growing associations in Western Australia in their early years, 1985 marked the inaugural year of the Wolves' acceptance into District basketball. In just their second season, both the A Grade Men and A Grade Women won State League championships.

Early success in the SBL
1989 saw the formation of the State Basketball League (SBL) with both a men's and women's competition. Wanneroo, trading as the Wolves, entered a team into both the Men's SBL and Women's SBL. In 1990, the women's team reached their first WSBL Grand Final, where they defeated the Stirling Senators 70–67. In 1992, the women's team faced the Swan City Mustangs in the grand final, where they won their second title behind a 74–64 win. In 1993, the men's team won their first championship despite finishing the regular season in seventh place with an 11–13 record. In the 1993 MSBL Grand Final, the Wolves defeated the Cockburn Cougars 109–91 behind player-coach Vince Kelley. In 1995, the women's team won the club's first minor premiership with a club-best record of 22–2. They reached the WSBL Grand Final, where they defeated the Mustangs 2–0 in the best-of-three series. In 1997, the women's team reached their fourth WSBL Grand Final, where they were defeated 62–52 by the Willetton Tigers.

Halcyon era
Between 1998 and 2010, neither team saw much success, as the club failed to record any minor premierships or grand final appearances. In 2011, the men's team had their best-ever regular-season campaign, as they finished second with an 18–8 record behind the likes of Greg Hire, Damian Matacz, Brad Robbins and coach Ben Ettridge. In the finals, the Wolves defeated the Willetton Tigers 2–1 in the first round, before sweeping the Cockburn Cougars in the semi-finals to reach their first MSBL Grand Final since 1993. There they defeated the Perry Lakes Hawks 88–83 to claim their second championship and end their 18-year drought. Hire was named Grand Final MVP for his 31 points and 28 rebounds.

In 2012, both teams finished atop their respective ladders, with the women earning a 16–6 record, while the men set a team-best 23–3 record. Both teams failed to reach the grand final however.

In 2013, both teams made grand final appearances. In the WSBL Grand Final, the women's team defeated the Kalamunda Eastern Suns 72–47 to claim their fourth championship. In the MSBL Grand Final, the Wolves were defeated 77–74 by the Lakeside Lightning.

In 2014, Wanneroo Basketball Association changed their trading name from Wanneroo Wolves to Joondalup Wolves, but success did not follow suit as the women lost in the semi-finals, while the men failed to qualify for the finals for the first time since 2007.

In 2015, the men's team claimed their second minor premiership after finishing the regular season atop the ladder with a 23–3 record. They went on to reach the MSBL Grand Final, where they won their third championship with a 105–75 win over the South West Slammers.

In 2016, the women's team claimed their third minor premiership with a 19–3 record before going on to lose 60–58 to the Willetton Tigers in the WSBL Grand Final. The men's team meanwhile made their way through to the MSBL Grand Final, where they were defeated 96–84 by the Cockburn Cougars.

In 2017, the men's team reached their third straight MSBL Grand Final, where they lost 103–70 to the Perth Redbacks.

In 2018, the Wolves moved into HBF Arena after playing out of Joondalup Basketball Stadium for more than three decades. In August 2018, after making their fourth straight MSBL Grand Final and sixth in eight years, the Wolves were entered into the conversation as one of the power teams of Western Australia's state sporting leagues. The Wolves went on to lose in the grand final for the third straight year, going down 94–87 to the Perry Lakes Hawks.

In 2019, the men's team claimed their third minor premiership after finishing the regular season atop the ladder with a 20–6 record. They went on to reach their fifth straight MSBL Grand Final, where they lost 92–80 to the Geraldton Buccaneers.

In 2020, the women's team finished as minor premiers in the amateur-based West Coast Classic. They reached the grand final, where they defeated the Perry Lakes Hawks 72–54.

In 2021, the SBL was rebranded as NBL1 West. The Wolves women reached the grand final in the inaugural NBL1 West season, where they were defeated by the Willetton Tigers 65–54.

Notable club figures
In August 2015, Wanneroo Basketball Association announced the retirements of Life Members and longstanding employees Van and Mary Kailis. Having commenced work with WBA in 1986, Van and Mary Kailis were considered the forefront of basketball's growth in the Wanneroo area, building one of the most successful and professionally operated basketball associations in Western Australia. During his time with the Wolves, Van won WSBL Coach of the Year in 1990, guided the women to championships in 1986 and 1990, and worked as an assistant coach with the Wolves men.

Accolades

Women
Championships: 4 (1990, 1992, 1995, 2013)
Grand Final appearances: 7 (1990, 1992, 1995, 1997, 2013, 2016, 2021)
Minor premierships: 3 (1995, 2012, 2016)

Men
Championships: 3 (1993, 2011, 2015)
Grand Final appearances: 8 (1993, 2011, 2013, 2015, 2016, 2017, 2018, 2019)
Minor premierships: 3 (2012, 2015, 2019)

References

External links
WBA's official website

Basketball teams in Western Australia
NBL1 West teams
Basketball teams established in 1989
1989 establishments in Australia